Christophe Bataille, born 1971, is a French writer.

Works 
1993: Annam, éditions Arléa – Prix du premier roman and Prix des Deux Magots.
1994: Absinthe, Arléa, 1994 – Prix littéraire de la vocation
1997: Le Maître des heures, Éditions Grasset
1999: Vive l'enfer, Grasset
2002: J'envie la félicité des bêtes, Grasset,
2006: Quartier général du bruit, Grasset
2008: Le Rêve de Machiavel, Grasset
2012: L'Élimination cowritten with Rithy Panh, Grasset,  – Prix Essai France Télévisions, Prix Aujourd'hui, Prix Joseph-Kessel and Prix livre et droits de l'homme de la Ville de Nancy, all won in 2012
L'image Manquante, film by Rithy Panh whose off voice he wrote as a poem - Prize "Un Certain Regard" au 66e festival de Cannes
 L'Expérience, Grasset

External links 
 Christophe Bataille Un témoin on L'Humanité
 Christophe Bataille on Babelio (with picture)
 Christophe Bataille, le désert algérien on Europe 1

20th-century French non-fiction writers
20th-century French male writers
21st-century French non-fiction writers
Prix des Deux Magots winners
Joseph Kessel Prize recipients
Prix du premier roman winners
HEC Paris alumni
1971 births
Living people